Brian Ahern may refer to:

Brian Ahern (footballer) (born 1952), Scottish footballer
Brian Ahern (producer) (born 1945), Canadian record producer and guitarist
Brian Aherne (1902–1986), British actor